Natasha Sara Georgeos (born August 6, 1987) is a Saint Lucian swimmer, who specialized in butterfly events. Georgeos qualified for the women's 100 m butterfly at the 2004 Summer Olympics in Athens, without posting her entry time.

References

1987 births
Living people
Saint Lucian female swimmers
Olympic swimmers of Saint Lucia
Swimmers at the 2004 Summer Olympics
Female butterfly swimmers